In Unix and Unix-like operating systems,  is the command and system call used to change the access permissions and the special mode flags (the setuid, setgid, and sticky flags) of file system objects (files and directories). Collectively these were originally called its modes, and the name  was chosen as an abbreviation of change mode.

History
A  command first appeared in AT&T UNIX version 1, along with the  system call.

As systems grew in number and types of users, access-control lists were added to many file systems in addition to these most basic modes to increase flexibility.

The version of  bundled in GNU coreutils was written by David MacKenzie and Jim Meyering. The command is available as a separate package for Microsoft Windows as part of the UnxUtils collection of native Win32 ports of common GNU Unix-like utilities. The  command has also been ported to the IBM i operating system.

Command syntax

Throughout this section, ser refers to the owner of the file, as a reminder that the symbolic form of the command uses "u".

chmod [options] mode[,mode] file1 [file2 ...]

Usually implemented options include:
  Recursive, i.e. include objects in subdirectories.
  verbose, show objects changed (unchanged objects are not shown).

If a symbolic link is specified, the target object is affected. File modes directly associated with symbolic links themselves are typically not used.

$ ls -l findPhoneNumbers.sh
-rwxr-xr--  1 dgerman  staff  823 Dec 16 15:03 findPhoneNumbers.sh
$ stat -c %a findPhoneNumbers.sh
754

The script  can be read, written to, and executed by the user ; read and executed by members of the  group; and only read by any other users.

The main parts of the  permissions:

For example: 

Each group of three characters define permissions for each class:
 the three leftmost characters, define permissions for the User class (i.e. the file owner).
 the middle three characters, define permissions for the Group class (i.e. the group owning the file)
 the rightmost three characters, define permissions for the Others class. In this example, users who are not the owner of the file and who are not members of the Group (and, thus, are in the Others class) have no permission to access the file.

Numerical permissions 
The  numerical format accepts up to four digits. The three rightmost digits define permissions for the file user, the group, and others. Each digit of the three rightmost digits represents a binary value, which controls the "read", "write" and "execute" permissions respectively. A value of 1 means a class is allowed that action, while a 0 means it is disallowed.

For example,  would allow:
 "read" (4), "write" (2), and "execute" (1) for the User class; i.e., 7 (4 + 2 + 1).
 "read" (4) and "execute" (1) for the Group class; i.e., 5 (4 + 1).
 Only "read" (4) for the Others class.

A numerical code permits execution if and only if it is odd (i.e.

Numeric example 
Change permissions to permit members of the  group to update a file:
$ ls -l sharedFile
-rw-r--r--  1 jsmith programmers 57 Jul  3 10:13  sharedFile
$ chmod 664 sharedFile
$ ls -l sharedFile
-rw-rw-r--  1 jsmith programmers 57 Jul  3 10:13  sharedFile

$ chmod 0664 sharedFile

Symbolic modes

The  command also accepts a finer-grained symbolic notation, which allows modifying specific modes while leaving other modes untouched. The symbolic mode is composed of three components, which are combined to form a single string of text:
$ chmod [references][operator][modes] file ...

Classes of users are used to distinguish to whom the permissions apply. If no classes are specified "all" is implied. The classes are represented by one or more of the following letters:

The  program uses an operator to specify how the modes of a file should be adjusted. The following operators are accepted:

The modes indicate which permissions are to be granted or removed from the specified classes. There are three basic modes which correspond to the basic permissions:

Multiple changes can be specified by separating multiple symbolic modes with commas (without spaces). If a user is not specified, chmod will check the umask and the effect will be as if "a" was specified except bits that are set in the umask are not affected.

Symbolic examples
 Add write permission to the Group's access modes of a directory, allowing users in the same group to add files:$ ls -ld shared_dir # show access modes before chmod
drwxr-xr-x   2 jsmitt  northregion 96 Apr 8 12:53 shared_dir
$ chmod  g+w shared_dir
$ ls -ld shared_dir  # show access modes after chmod
drwxrwxr-x   2 jsmitt  northregion 96 Apr 8 12:53 shared_dir
 Remove write permissions for all classes, preventing anyone from writing to the file:$ ls -l ourBestReferenceFile
-rw-rw-r--   2 tmiller  northregion 96 Apr 8 12:53 ourBestReferenceFile
$ chmod a-w ourBestReferenceFile
$ ls -l ourBestReferenceFile
-r--r--r--   2 tmiller  northregion 96 Apr 8 12:53 ourBestReferenceFile
drwxr-----   2 ebowman  northregion 96 Apr 8 12:53 referenceLib
$ chmod ug=rx referenceLib
$ ls -ld referenceLib
dr-xr-x---   2 ebowman  northregion 96 Apr 8 12:53 referenceLib
 Add the read and write permissions to the user and group classes of a file or directory named :$ chmod ug+rw sample
$ ls -ld sample
drw-rw----   2 rsanchez  budget       96 Dec  8 12:53 sample
 Remove all permissions, allowing no one to read, write, or execute the file named  to no useful end.$ chmod a-rwx sample
$ ls -l sample
----------   2 rswven  planning       96 Dec  8 12:53 sample
$ ls -ld sample
drw-rw----   2 oschultz  warehousing       96 Dec  8 12:53 NY_DBs
$ chmod ug=rx sample
$ ls -ld sample
dr-xr-x---   2 oschultz  warehousing       96 Dec  8 12:53 NJ_DBs

Special modes

The  command is also capable of changing the additional permissions or special modes of a file or directory. The symbolic modes use '' to represent the setuid and setgid modes, and '' to represent the sticky mode. The modes are only applied to the appropriate classes, regardless of whether or not other classes are specified.

Most operating systems support the specification of special modes numerically, particularly in octal, but some do not. On these systems, only the symbolic modes can be used.

Command line examples

See also
 File-system permissions
 chattr, the command used to change the attributes of a file or directory on Linux systems
 chown, the command used to change the owner of a file or directory on Unix-like systems
 chgrp, the command used to change the group of a file or directory on Unix-like systems
 cacls, a command used on Windows NT and its derivatives to modify the access control lists associated with a file or directory
 attrib
 umask, restricts mode (permissions) at file or directory creation on Unix-like systems
 User identifier
 Group identifier
 List of Unix commands

References

External links

 
 
 
 chmod — manual page from GNU coreutils.
 GNU "Setting Permissions" manual
 CHMOD-Win 3.0 — Freeware Windows' ACL ↔ CHMOD converter.
 Beginners tutorial with on-line "live" example

File system permissions
Operating system security
Standard Unix programs
Unix file system-related software
Unix SUS2008 utilities
Plan 9 commands
Inferno (operating system) commands
IBM i Qshell commands